Kong Duen-yee (1923–17 August 1966), known then as the actress Mui Yee, was a Chinese movie star in Hong Kong.

Career

Entertainment 
In 1937, Mui became an actress in Hong Kong films. Mui appeared in The Sentimental Woman (aka The Heartbroken Woman), a 1937 Romance film directed by So Yi and Liu Shut. In several films, Mui depicted a wealthy wife scorned and other romantic characters. Mui's film career ran throughout the 1950s, at a time when mainstream cinema in Hong Kong was just beginning to challenge the conservative Asian culture. Mui's last film was Flesh and Blood (aka Renegade, The Criminals), a 1963 film directed by Leung Fung. Mui is credited with over 140 films.

In 1960, Mui was diagnosed with tongue cancer, she retired from acting and decided to become a preacher as which she acted for about seven years.

Christian leader 
In 1963, facing certain death, Kong turned from a worldly, carnal lifestyle to religion and reacted to the Pentecostal revival which had reached Asia to start a Church called the New Testament Church (NTC). She was appointed a prophetess and an Apostle by God to continue the work of the book of Acts in the Bible. In addition to teaching "speaking in tongues" as a means of salvation, she began promulgating "The Blood, Water and Holy Spirit", of which God had inspired her from her Bible readings of 1 John 5:6-8, but is actually a teaching that many Christians have always held dear: that Jesus shed His blood for the remission of sins, began His ministry when He was baptized, and ended His ministry when He sent down the Holy Spirit to build His church on the Day of Pentecost. (It is believed by Bible scholars that the Apostle John wrote this letter to refute some erroneous beliefs of the Gnostics that Jesus was just a man and not God-in-the-flesh.)

Kong also taught her primarily female followers (of which several were former fans) teachings that bordered on numerology, including the "7.21 Inspiration" (referring to July 21), which she called the "rebuilding of the New Testament Church by the Holy Spirit." Kong prophesied that her religious group would become famous and cause worldwide revival. Upon her gruesome death, she was succeeded by her daughter Ruth Chang. But soon afterwards Ruth was convinced by her husband that her mother's teachings were heretical and that the NTC sect is a cult. Chang then moved to Southern California and became a pastor of a Pentecostal Christian church (Assemblies of God). Elijah Hong then succeeded her, undoing the damages left by Chang .

Personal 
Kong's ancestry is in Nanhai County (defunct), Guangdong. She battled with tongue cancer and in 1966, Kong died due to complications of tongue cancer.

Filmography

Films 
1937 War And Survival
1937 The Sentimental Woman
1938 Hongling Beige
1938 The Beautiful Puppet
1938 Yanzhi Lei
1939 Nu ren shi jie
1940 Changsheng Gongzhu
1940 Cong xin suo yu
1941 Xiao Laohu
1941 Ye Shang Hai
1941 Love In The Schoolyard
1941 Qian jin zhi zi
1949 Love And Hate On The Sea
1949 Dead End Case
1950 Laughter And Tears
1950 Kowloon City Fire
1952 Pin jian fu qi bai shi shuai
1952 Leng yue ban lang gui
1952 A Couple In Love - Fung Pui Jan
1953 The Guiding Light
1953 Family - Yuen-yi
1953 Death Of A Beauty - Lee Git Ching
1953 Bird In The Sunset
1953 In the Face of Demolition - Fong 
1953 Bright Night - Chen Bailu
1953 Things Of The Past
1954 The Noble Family - Luk Wan-Sin
1954 Da di
1954 Da lei yu
1954: Orchid Of The Valley
1954: An Unforgettable Song
1954: The Hills Divide Us
1954: Zi shu nu - Ah Jan
1955 Love (Part 1)
1955 Love (Part 2)
1955 An Orphan's Tragedy - Rainbow, Choi-Hung 
1955 Love Trilogy
1955: The Next Generation
1955: My Wife, My Wife
1955: The Hypocritical Heart - Mui Wan Kam
1955 The Pagoda Of Long Life
1955 Broken Spring Dreams
1955 The Devoted Lover
1955 Honeymoon
1956 The Sad Wife In A Grand House
1956 Romance At The Western Chamber
1956 The Precious Lotus Lamp
1956 Fire
1956 The Peacock's Sad Tale
1956 Madam Mei 
1956 The King And The Beauty - Ho Wai-lan
1956 Beauty In The Mist
1957 The Thunderstorm - Tse Fung 
1957 The Story Of Liang Tianlai
1957 Pearl's Reconciliation - Fox Spirit Pak Ling-sin
1957 The Lotus Lamp
1957 The Lizhi's Tale
1957 Her Tragic Death
1957 The Fox-Spirit's Romance 
1957 Escorting Lady Jing On A 1,000 Mile Journey 
1957 The Case Of The Blood Stain
1958 Story of the Vulture Conqueror
1958 A Scholar Redeems His Love
1958 The Prince's Romantic Affairs
1958 Prince Of Thieves (The Sequel)
1958 The Lotus Lantern (Part 3)
1958 Marriage On The Rocks (婚變) - Ng Suet-Man (Credited as Mui Yee)
1959 Beauty Slain By The Sword 
 1959 Money (aka Qian) - Hung's wife, Mrs. Hung. 
1959 The Road (aka Lo) - Ah Chui.
1959 Seven Swordsman Leave Tianshan
1960 Magic Lamp
1960 Nazha sheshan jiu mu - Na Cha's Mother
1962 The Reunion
 1963 Flesh and Blood (aka Renegade, The Criminals)

References

External links 
 
 Mui Yee at hkcinemagic.com
 Mui Yee at letterboxd.com
 Yee Mui at filmaffinity.com
 Mui Yee at senscritique.com

1923 births
1966 deaths
Actresses from Beijing
Hong Kong film actresses
20th-century Hong Kong actresses
20th-century Chinese actresses
Deaths from cancer in Hong Kong
Hong Kong Christians
Cantonese opera actresses
Singers from Beijing
Chinese film actresses
20th-century Hong Kong women singers
Chinese emigrants to British Hong Kong